Ostrelj may refer to: 

Ostrelj, Montenegro, a village in Bijelo Polje Municipality, in northern Montenegro
Oštrelj, a village in the municipality of Bor, in Serbia